College of Applied Science and Technology may refer to:

 Illinois State University College of Applied Science and Technology, U.S
 Saskatchewan Institute of Applied Science and Technology (SIAST), Canada
 The College of Applied Science and Technology of the Rochester Institute of Technology
 University of Arizona, College of Applied Science & Technology, U.S.

See also 
 College of Applied Science (disambiguation)